Jonas Chickering (April 5, 1798 – December 8, 1853) was a piano manufacturer in Boston, Massachusetts.

Jonas Chickering was born in Mason Village, and raised in nearby New Ipswich, New Hampshire where his father Abner Chickering kept a farm and worked as a blacksmith. Chickering apprenticed three years as a cabinet maker with John Gould.

In 1818 Chickering removed to Boston with Gould's permission, working for cabinet-maker James Baker, but one year later began working for pianomaker John Osborn at 12 Orange Street. In 1823, Chickering formed a partnership with pianomaker James Stewart; they produced 15 pianos the first year at workshops at 20 Common street and sold their first piano on June 23, 1823 for $275.

Stewart & Chickering dissolved after four years, and in 1830 Chickering became associated with John Mackay, a merchant, as well as organ and pianomaker who had worked with Alpheus Babcock, doing business as Chickering & Co. at 416 Washington street. In 1837 Chickering & Mackays (with Mackay's son William H. Mackay) built a new five story factory, with warerooms and a small concert hall, at 334 Washington Street, and warehouse at Franklin square.

John Mackay was lost at sea February 1841, and Chickering mortgaged the factory and bought out his and William H. Mackay's shares in installments. The Washington street factory burned December 1, 1852 putting out over 200 workmen and amounting to $250,000 loss, as well as all the tools and patterns, and a nearly completed prototype for a grand piano (later indicated as being overstrung). Chickering organized a temporary factory, and began construction of a new steam-powered factory started at 791 Tremont street, designed by Edward Payson to Chickering's specifications.

Chickering died before the factory's completion, on December 8, 1853. Over 800 people, including leading piano manufacturers and many of the societies of which Chickering had been a member, marched in his funeral procession and the mayor of Boston ordered the ringing of the city's church bells.

At the time of his death, Chickering's company had built over 12,000 pianos and was producing about 1,500 a year worth $200,000, almost twice the sales of Timothy Gilbert, his largest competitor in Boston. His pianos at the London International Exhibition of 1851 earned a gold medal with special mention for the grand, which was noted for brilliancy and power as well as its great solidity. Chickering patented single piece iron frames combined with wrest plank bridges and damper guides in square pianos, and with massive wrest plank terminations in grands; Chickering & Mackays were assignees of an action patented by Alpheus Babcock, and licensed actions patented by Edwin Brown and George Howe. Chickering pioneered pronounced curved hammer strike lines in squares which permitted larger hammers, and is also credited encouraging Ichabod Washburn to develop the first music wire produced in the United States.

Chickering, with Henry W. Pickering and Edward Frothingborn incorporated a charter to erect the Boston Music Hall, paid for by subscription and built in 1852. He served as president of the Handel and Haydn Society, and of the Massachusetts Charitable Mechanic Association, which he joined in 1829, until his death.

Chickering married Elizabeth Sumner Harraden November 20, 1823. They had four children: Thomas E. Chickering, C. Frank Chickering, George H. Chickering, and Anna Chickering. Chickering's sons worked as pianomakers, and became partners in the company in 1853 forming Chickering and Sons.

Notes

References

Gould, Augustus and Francis Kidder, (1852) The history of New Ipswich. Gould and Lincoln, Boston p. 349-351
Hale, Charles "Boston Music Hall" To-Day : A Boston Literary Journal, Redding & Co., Boston, vol.2 July - December, 1852 no.45, p. 291
"Chickering's Pianoforte Manufactory" Scientific American, vol. 8, no.14, December 18, 1852. Munn & Co., New York. p. 107
Blake, John L. (1858) "Jonas Chickering" Freeman Hunt, ed. Lives of American Merchants Derby & Jackson, New York p. 493
McCabe, James D. Jr Great Fortunes, and How They Were Made (1871) George Maclean, Philadelphia, New York and Boston
Parton, James, (1884) "Ichabod Washburn" The Captains of Industry Houghton, Mifflin & Co., Boston
Schlesinger, Kathleen. (1910–11) "Pianoforte." Encyclopædia Britannica, 11th ed., London.
"Story of a Medford Piano" (1922) Medford Historical Society Papers, vol. 25. Medford, MA.
The Jonas Chickering Centennial Celebration (1924) Cheltenham, New York.
Goodman, Phebe S. (2003) The Garden Squares of Boston. University Press of New England, Lebanon, NH p. 84

External links

 
 Pictures of Chickering pianos
 

1798 births
1853 deaths
People from Greenville, New Hampshire
Piano makers
Businesspeople from Boston
19th-century American people
Burials at Mount Auburn Cemetery
19th-century American businesspeople